Airborne is a fictional character from the G.I. Joe: A Real American Hero toyline, comic books and animated series. He is the G.I. Joe Team's helicopter assault trooper and debuted in 1983.

Profile
His real name is Franklin E. Talltree, and his rank is that of sergeant E-5. Airborne was born in a Navajo Reservation in Arizona. His primary military specialty is an airborne infantryman, while his secondary military specialty is helicopter gunship gunner.

Airborne's parents are oil-rich Navajos who indulged their eldest son with sky-diving lessons, forever setting his love for being in the air. In college he also had interest in the legal system. He studied law and passed the Arizona State Bar exams. He later joined the army and opted for airborne training. He graduated at the top of his class from Fort Benning Airborne School. He is an expert in using Hughes Helicopter Chain Gun, M-16, M-60 and M-1911A auto pistol.

Toys
Airborne was first released as an action figure in 1983. The same figure was included in the "Original Team" mail-away set in 1986.

A new version of Airborne was released as part of the Spy Troops series in 2003. He is renamed Sgt. Airborne and carded together with the new Tele-Viper action figure. A cause for confusion was introduced by the figure being packaged with the Tele-Viper as "Halo Jumper". The cardback, figures, accessories, and instructions are the same for both versions. This version was also recolored in 2004, and packaged with the "Sky Sweeper" jet, as part of the Valor vs Venom line.

Comics

Marvel Comics

Airborne first appeared in issue #11 of the Marvel Comics series G.I. Joe: A Real American Hero. He flies a glider against Cobra forces threatening the Alaskan Pipeline. Airborne has a cameo in issue #24, as part of the cargo crew for a Joe transport plane. He later assists Spirit in a supervisory mission to safeguard Snake Eyes. This turns into a running battle with Cobra officers Destro, Firefly and "Fred", one of the many Crimson Guardsmen. Airborne and the other Joes are assisted by the ninja known as the Soft Master, who treats Airborne's bullet wounds.

He is the co-pilot for Wild Bill in the Dragonfly, when the Joes attacks the Cobra controlled town of Springfield. Airborne also participates in the first Cobra civil war.

He is again a co-pilot, this time in the Tomahawk, when he assists in rescuing Snake Eyes and Storm Shadow from the Cobra Consulate in New York City.

Animated series

Sunbow
Airborne appeared in the Sunbow G.I. Joe animated series voiced by Peter Cullen. Airborne has a psychic bond with his brother Tommy. He first appeared in the mini-series "A Real American Hero".

In the episode "Operation Mind Menace", Airborne joins Flash in tracking down Cobra to a base on Easter Island, after Cobra kidnapped a Hawaiian girl who possessed psychic abilities. Airborne's brother Tommy was being kidnapped at the same time; the two brothers shared a psychic bond, allowing them to sense when the other is in danger, and the trauma of the event affected the psychic link Tommy and Airborne shared. The Joes were captured by Cobra, and Cobra Commander used Tommy's abilities to attack the Joes, by transforming two Easter Island heads into giant stone warriors. Airborne and Flash fought off their attackers, until they were rescued by Duke and Lady Jaye. The Joes then go to rescue Tommy, who is being held at a Cobra base in the Himalayas. Airborne helps Tommy overcome Cobra's control over him by bringing up their childhood memories.

The episode "Cobra Soundwaves" reveals that Airborne has extrasensory perception. Due to this, he senses that Cobra has kidnapped Sheikh Ali.

G.I. Joe: The Movie
Airborne also appeared briefly in the 1987 animated film G.I. Joe: The Movie.

Resolute
Airborne briefly appears and is along with the Joes looking of the footage of Moscow's destruction cause by Cobra's Particle Cannon.

Sky Patrol Airborne

A second Airborne was released as part of the Sky Patrol line in 1990. His real name is Robert M. Six, and he was born in Lake Geneva, Wisconsin. He is the "Sky Patrol" parachute assembler, and once the patrol is safely on the ground, he becomes their combat medic.

DiC cartoon
Airborne appeared in the DiC G.I. Joe cartoon, voiced by Phil Hayes.

References

External links
 Airborne at JMM's G.I. Joe Comics Home Page

Comics characters introduced in 1983
Fictional aviators
Fictional Navajo people
Fictional characters from Arizona
Fictional United States Army personnel
Male characters in animated series
Male characters in comics
Fictional military sergeants
G.I. Joe soldiers